New York Counterpoint for amplified clarinet and tape, or 9 clarinets and 3 bass clarinets (one part doubles B and bass), is a 1985 minimalist composition written by American composer Steve Reich. The piece, intended to capture the throbbing vibrancy of Manhattan, is notable for its ability to imitate electronic sounds through acoustic instrumentation.

History
The piece was commissioned in 1984 by clarinetist Richard Stoltzman for nine B-flat clarinets and three bass clarinets. This was the second in Reich's "counterpoint" series, preceded by Vermont Counterpoint (1982) for flutes, and followed by Electric Counterpoint (1987) for electric guitars and Cello Counterpoint (2003) for celli. Each of these works are scored for one live performer who plays against up to a dozen recordings of the same instrument. The canonic interplay in the composition creates multiple layers of sound, akin to Reich's earlier phase pieces. Out of the series, New York Counterpoint is considered the most rhythmically intricate and one of Reich's most well known works. The second movement of the piece was featured as a set work for Edexcel music A level between 2005 and 2016

Composition
New York Counterpoint is divided into three movements known only by their suggested tempi: fast, slow and fast.

Movement I (Fast)
The opening ostinato derives from the opening of a similar Reich piece, Music for 18 Musicians (1976). Out of the synthetic pulses arises a simple melody which repeats in phase with other groupings of clarinets. The use of interlocking repeated melodic patterns, according to Reich, echoes his earlier works Piano Phase (1967) and Violin Phase (1967). The theme recapitulates the pulses in an identical harmonic progression. A larger pattern is seen here as the interlocking melodies and chordal pulses are too in phase. These resulting melodies or melodic patterns then become the basis for the following section as the other surrounding parts in the contrapuntal web fade out.

Movement II (Slow)
The second movement, while much slower, plays with the same ideas of phase shifting and melodic imitation. The persistent use of staggered repetition of melodic material is at the very heart of the movement's construction. In the nature of the patterns, the movements harmonic combination reflects the contemporaneously composed Sextet (1985). However, this movement's change of tempo is abrupt and halved, establishing an ambiguity between measured groupings. In this case, three groups of four eight notes, or four groups of three eight notes. Despite the ambiguity and phase, this movement is the most melodic of the three, making its presence strong as an interlude and catalyst for the bombastic finale.

Movement III (Fast)
The final movement of New York Counterpoint draws attention to the bass clarinets, which function to accent in prominence. The melody, presented in a slow six-eight, is sharply interrupted by an antiphonal hocket in the bass clarinet, first one and then the other while the upper clarinets remain similar. In the program notes, Reich claims that "the effect, by change of accent, is to vary the perception of that which in fact is not changing." This movement, while less focused on the obvious theme of phase and drone, takes both elements from the previous movements and slyly incorporates them into the bass clarinet line.

Recordings 

 Reich. New York Counterpoint. The harmony of isolation. Roeland Hendrikx (clarinet), Antarctica Records (2020).

The version on Works 1965–1995'' lasts around eleven and a half minutes.

References

Compositions by Steve Reich
1985 compositions